Aatha Naan Pass Ayittaen is a 1990 Tamil language drama film produced and directed by M. K. Saimohan. The film stars Arjun, Shantipriya and Malashri. It was released on 23 November 1990.

Cast

Arjun as Chinnasamy
Shantipriya
Malashri
Gandhimathi
Anuja
S. R. Vijaya
Senthil
Vennira Aadai Moorthy
Jai Ganesh
K. Kannan
Usilaimani
Kullamani
Sharjah Sheriff
Satishkumar
Venky
Jacky Siva

Soundtrack
The film score and the soundtrack were composed by Vidyasagar. The soundtrack, released in 1990, features 5 tracks.

Release
Aatha Naan Pass Aayitten was released on 23 November 1990 alongside another Arjun starrer Thangaikku Oru Thalattu.

References

1990 films
1990s Tamil-language films
Indian drama films
Films scored by Vidyasagar
1990 drama films